Kirk MacDonald (born December 18, 1983) is a Canadian former professional ice hockey forward working as the head coach for the Dubuque Fighting Saints of the United States Hockey League (USHL).

Career 
MacDonald previously served as the head coach of the Reading Royals of the ECHL, where he led the Royals to a winning record in each of his six years at the helm. He previously played for the Providence Bruins of the American Hockey League and was briefly under contract to the Boston Bruins, having played in several National Hockey League preseason games.

References

External links

1983 births
Albany River Rats players
Des Moines Buccaneers players
Florida Everblades players
Houston Aeros (1994–2013) players
Ice hockey people from British Columbia
Iowa Stars players
Living people
Providence Bruins players
Reading Royals players
RPI Engineers men's ice hockey players
Sportspeople from Victoria, British Columbia
Canadian ice hockey right wingers